Gunter Brewer (born August 9, 1964) is an American football coach who is currently the wide receivers coach at the University of Maryland. A longtime wide receivers coach, Brewer gained the reputation of an elite receivers coach, coaching the likes of Randy Moss, Dez Bryant, and Biletnikoff Award winner Justin Blackmon.

Coaching career 
After his playing career at Wake Forest ended, Brewer spent time with the Demon Deacons as a strength & conditioning assistant, before going on to assistant coach posts at Ole Miss, East Tennessee State, Marshall, North Carolina, and Oklahoma State.

Brewer left Oklahoma State in 2011 to join the coaching staff at Ole Miss as their associate head coach, passing game coordinator, and wide receivers coach. He only spent one season with the Rebels before leaving to join the coaching staff at North Carolina as their co-offensive coordinator and wide receivers coach.

Brewer was named the wide receivers coach for the Philadelphia Eagles before the 2018 season. A season where they played as the defending Super Bowl champions and finished 9–7, Brewer had his contract terminated by the Eagles as the receiving corps had issues with substitutions among other things.

Brewer was hired to be the wide receivers coach at Louisville in 2019.

References

External links 
 Louisville Cardinals bio

1964 births
Living people
People from Columbus, Mississippi
Players of American football from Mississippi
American football wide receivers
Wake Forest Demon Deacons football players
Wake Forest Demon Deacons football coaches
Ole Miss Rebels football coaches
East Tennessee State Buccaneers football coaches
Maryland Terrapins football coaches
Marshall Thundering Herd football coaches
North Carolina Tar Heels football coaches
Oklahoma State Cowboys football coaches
Philadelphia Eagles coaches
Louisville Cardinals football coaches